Anna Brelsford McCoy (born 1940) is an American artist.  While she is clearly of the Brandywine School of art, she has developed her own distinctive style.

Biography
McCoy's mother was Ann Wyeth McCoy, the youngest daughter of the illustrator N. C. Wyeth who was closely tied to the Brandywine School approach to art. Her father was John W. McCoy, a student of N. C. Wyeth and son of a vice president of the DuPont Company. When McCoy was still a child, she decided she wanted to be a portrait artist. McCoy began studying art with her aunt, Carolyn Wyeth, at the age of fourteen. She also studied with Charles Vinson. Her uncle Andrew Wyeth and his son and her cousin, Jamie, loomed large in the School.

McCoy graduated from Bennett College in 1960 with a bachelor of arts degree. Instead of attending the Pennsylvania Academy of Fine Arts, she got married.  She married Frolic Weymouth and they stayed married for 18 years until their divorce in 1979. While she was married, she didn't paint very much and didn't start painting again until 1980.

McCoy is the author of the book, John W. McCoy, American Painter. McCoy lives in Chadds Ford, Pennsylvania and "paints what she likes." She also spends time in Maine. She is known for her portrait work, as well as landscapes and still lifes.

References

1940 births
Living people
20th-century American painters
20th-century American women artists
American biographers
Bennett College (New York) alumni
Painters from Pennsylvania
Pennsylvania Academy of the Fine Arts alumni
Wyeth family
People from Chadds Ford Township, Pennsylvania
American women painters